Dover is a town in Dutchess County, New York, United States. The population was 8,415 at the 2020 census.  The town was named after Dover in England, the home town of an early settler.

The town of Dover is located on the eastern boundary of the county, north of Pawling, south of Amenia, and west of the state of Connecticut.

History
In 1637, the Pequot people had been driven from their former homes in Connecticut and settled in what is now Dover. They were led by Gideon Mauwee for part of their time in this location.

The town was formed in 1807 from part of the town of Pawling. The first town meeting took place in the home of John Preston, an early settler. That home, built circa 1730, is now an inn and restaurant known as Old Drovers Inn.

The Harlem Valley Psychiatric Center (1924–1994) was a major source of employment for Dover and the surrounding areas. When the center was closed in 1994, many businesses in the area were hit hard. Many of the brick and marble buildings on the grounds still stand. The property and buildings were purchased in 2003 by the Benjamin Development Corporation, and the eastern portion was sold to Olivet Management in 2013.

Geography
The town is drained by the Ten Mile River, which flows from the north through the center of town, then turns east into Connecticut and joins the Housatonic River.

The eastern town line is the border of Connecticut.

The Appalachian Trail passes through the town.

Government and emergency services
The legislature and executive powers of the government of Dover are invested in the Town Board, consisting of the Town Supervisor, currently, elected to a two-year term, and four council members, currently, Linda French' Rich Yeno, Linda French and Paul Palmer, each elected to four-year terms. The Town Board is accountable for the health, safety and welfare of all citizens. The body is responsible for adopting and amending the Town Comprehensive or Master Plan, and can adopt zoning and land use regulations or issue other permits in addition to performing various administrative functions.

Volunteer boards
The town government includes a series of volunteer boards.

Single-family residence proposals, two-family residence proposals and residence accessory structure proposals are normally not reviewed, except in special circumstances.

The Conservation Advisory Council advises the Town Board on matters affecting the preservation, quality and use of the natural resources and environment of the Town of Dover. The Superintendent appoints the CAC Chair Evan van Hook.

The Planning Board considers site plans, subdivision proposals and special use permits. The Planning Board also reports on the adoption of official maps and amendments to zoning ordinance.

The Zoning Board of Appeals interprets zoning laws and considers variance requests, which are requests for relief from zoning law.

Departments
Departments of the town government include the following.

The Office of the Supervisor is run by Supervisor Ryan Courtien and includes the offices of the Supervisor, Human Resources/Civil Service Management and Finance.

The Office of the Town Clerk is headed by independent elected official Katie Palmer House. The Town Clerk is responsible for the collection and release of vital records of both the citizens (such as birth certificates, etc.) and the government (Town Board Meeting Minutes). The keeping of records of local laws and statistics and issuing of licenses and permits is handled by this department.

The Assessor Department deal with tax-exemption and assessment related grievances.

The Building Department deals with building permits and code enforcement. This department can utilize inspections for enforcement.

The Highway Department is led by the Highway Superintendent who is an independent elected official. This department deals with road maintenance, road construction and road closures.

Recreation is headed by the Recreation Director who coordinates the public recreational services provided by or through the town such as Town Basketball, the public pool and the town day camp for children entering grades Pre-K to Sixth that is run at the public pool facility.

The Tax Collector or "Receiver of Taxes" is responsible for collection of town and county property taxes and is an independent elected official.

The Justice Court is the local court for the town of Dover which handles local issues such as traffic violations. Both town justices are elected officials.

Fire
Dover has a fire protection district and contracts with the J. H. Ketcham Hose Company for fire and ambulance service. The fire company operates two stations: Station One is on New York State Route 22 in Dover Plains and Station Two is on New York State Route 55 in Wingdale. The department is capable of handling fires, rescues, extrications, medical emergencies, hazardous material incidents and natural disasters. JHK operates a varied fire apparatus fleet based out of two stations, consisting of two engines (36-11, 36-12) one rescue pumper (36-13), one aerial (36-45), two utility/brush trucks (36-61, 36-62) and one BLS Ambulance (36-71) that responds to emergencies for second calls in the district from 5 p.m to 5 a.m. BLS EMS calls are handled by Town of Dover Ambulance who are contracted by the town with one ambulance to provide 24 hours a day, 7 days a week ambulance service. The department does have some of the better response times, most up to date equipment and training in eastern Dutchess County, as it is one of the more active departments on the Route 22 corridor in Dutchess County.

Demographics

As of the census of 2000, there were 8,565 people, 3,034 households, and 2,157 families residing in the town. The population density was 153.8 people per square mile (59.4/km2). There were 3,266 housing units at an average density of 58.6 per square mile (22.6/km2). The racial makeup of the town was 89.71% white, 5.5% African American, .33% Native American, .99% Asian, .06% Pacific Islander, 1.52% from other races, and 1.89% from two or more races. Hispanic or Latino of any race were 5.65% of the population.

There were 3,034 households, out of which 38.6% had children under the age of 18 living with them, 55.8% were married couples living together, 10.2% had a female householder with no husband present, and 28.9% were non-families. 23.3% of all households were made up of individuals, and 7.1% had someone living alone who was 65 years of age or older. The average household size was 2.74 and the average family size was 3.27.

In the town, the population was spread out, with 29.2% under the age of 18, 7.4% from 18 to 24, 32.2% from 25 to 44, 22.2% from 45 to 64, and 9.1% who were 65 years of age or older. The median age was 36 years. For every 100 females, there were 106.4 males. For every 100 females age 18 and over, there were 101.7 males.

The median income for a household in the town was $50,361, and the median income for a family was $57,979. Males had a median income of $40,885 versus $28,542 for females. The per capita income for the town was $21,250. About 6.3% of families and 8.4% of the population were below the poverty line, including 10.6% of those under age 18 and 6.5% of those age 65 or over.

Transportation

Road
Although Dover has no major highways, it does have two major thoroughfares. Route 22 crosses from the Pawling town line in the south to the Amenia town line in the north. Route 343 goes through town as well. In 2006, the NYSDOT administered the repaving of Route 22 through the town. The prime contractor was Callanan Industries, Inc., an Albany, New York based contractor. In 2007, repaving continued north from the town line into Amenia, New York with other contractors - Peckham Road Corp. in Wassaic and A. Colarusso & Son Inc., a Hudson, New York based contractor for the portion north of Wassaic.

Rail
Metro-North Railroad's Harlem Line runs through Dover with two rail commuter rail stations in town, with service to New York City. The Harlem Valley – Wingdale station is at the former State Hospital and Route 22, and the Dover Plains station is right in the town center. Trains leave every two hours in each direction during middays, evenings and weekends. In rush hours, service in the peak direction operates about every 30 minutes.

Bus
Dover is served by Dutchess County Public Transit's route "D" bus.

Communities and locations in Dover
Bains Corner: An area east of Dover Plains.
Chestnut Ridge: An area in the northwestern part of the town.
Dogtail Corners: An area in the southeastern part of the town.
Dover Furnace: An area in the central part of the town, south of Dover Plains, west of Route 22.
Dover Plains: A hamlet in the northeastern section of the town.
Duell Hollow: An area in the southeastern corner of the town.
Ellis Pond: A small lake in the southeastern section of the town.
Lake Weil: A small manmade lake in the southeastern part of the town.
Oniontown: A community in the northern part of town.
South Dover: A hamlet in the eastern part of the town.
Webatuck: An area in the southeastern part of the town on Route 55.
Wingdale: A hamlet in the southern part of the town on Route 22.

Camps
Camp Ramah in the Berkshires is located in Wingdale on Lake Ellis.

Electric power facilities

Cricket Valley Energy Center
Pursuant to Article 10 of the Public Service Law, Cricket Valley Energy Center LLC was granted a Certificate of Public Convenience and Necessity to build a 1,000-megawatt (MW) combined cycle natural gas powered plant in 2013. An Article VII Certificate of Environmental Compatibility and Public Need was granted on April 20, 2016 to build 345-kV transmission lines to interconnect to the site. The 1,100-MW project went into service in April 2020. There are three combustion turbines whose exhaust creates steam to drive a steam turbine. All of the turbines are manufactured by General Electric. It uses an air-cooled condenser to reduce water draw. It is located on a 193-acre former industrial area, the former Mid-Hudson Recycling Center, which was destroyed in a massive 1996 fire. It is fueled by natural gas supplied from a trunk pipeline, one of many that are located along the east coast. Its power is sold into the electric wholesale market administered by the NYISO.

References

External links

 Town of Dover official website
 Dover Plains Library

Poughkeepsie–Newburgh–Middletown metropolitan area
Towns in Dutchess County, New York
Dutchess